Spirographa ciliata is a species of lichenicolous fungus in the family Spirographaceae. It was first formally described by Klaus Kalb in 1993 as Cornutispora ciliata. Adam Grzegorz Flakus, Javier Etayo, and Jolanta Miądlikowska transferred it to genus Spirographa in 2019.

References

Ostropales
Fungi described in 1993
lichenicolous fungi
Taxa named by Klaus Kalb